

The Mitsubishi RP-1 is an Experimental Japanese twin-engined helicopter developed as part of a secret company research programme. The RP-1 was first revealed in April 1994 just before it started hover trials leading to a first flight on 14 September 1994.

Specifications

References

Notes

Bibliography

RP-1
1990s Japanese experimental aircraft
1990s Japanese helicopters
Twin-turbine helicopters
Aircraft first flown in 1994